Óscar de Marcos Arana (born 14 April 1989) is a Spanish professional footballer who plays for Athletic Bilbao usually as a midfielder but also as a full-back (right or left).

De Marcos began his career at Alavés, but went on to spend most of it at Athletic Bilbao, making over 450 official appearances and winning two Supercopa de España titles with the club.

Club career

Alavés
Born in Laguardia, Álava, de Marcos made his professional debut for nearby Deportivo Alavés. He first appeared in the Segunda División in the home fixture against CD Tenerife on 21 December 2008, coming on as a late substitute in a 2–1 loss.

De Marcos eventually played 20 games with the first team, as they dropped down a level at the season's end. He started his career as a forward.

Athletic Bilbao
In July 2009, de Marcos went straight into La Liga, penning a four-year deal with Athletic Bilbao for about €350,000. He made his club debut on 6 August in a 2–1 win at BSC Young Boys in the UEFA Europa League (2–2 aggregate, victory on the away goals rule), as a starter. Ten days later he opened the score against FC Barcelona in the season's Supercopa de España, as the Basques eventually lost 2–1 at home and 5–1 in total.

Having been signed initially for the reserve squad, de Marcos had more impact than expected – as did 16-year-old Iker Muniain – making 29 official appearances during 2009–10 and scoring three goals. He played his only match with the B team on 14 April 2010 against Zamora CF, in a campaign where they narrowly avoided relegation from the third tier.

De Marcos appeared less in his second season, but was also used as a full-back by manager Joaquín Caparrós, finishing the year with 15 games in all competitions. The following campaign, under Marcelo Bielsa, he played in that position and also in central midfield.

On 17 December 2011, de Marcos played roughly one hour of the league fixture against Real Zaragoza (2–1 home win) with a tear in his scrotum, which later required 25 stitches. On 4 January of the following year he extended his contract with the Lions until June 2016, with a release clause of €32 million.

De Marcos scored both legs of the 2011–12 Europa League round of 16 against Manchester United, as Athletic won both games and went through 5–3 on aggregate. He also scored in the next round against FC Schalke 04, playing in a total of 15 ties to help his team reach the final. They also made it to the decisive match in the domestic cup, losing to Barcelona.

On 13 October 2014, de Marcos agreed to a new three-year extension until 30 June 2019, with a buyout clause being set at €40 million. He also featured in all ten matches in both the UEFA Champions League and Europa League, but did not take part in the 2015 Spanish Cup final due to suspension (once again the result was a defeat to Barcelona, and his inexperienced replacement Unai Bustinza struggled to cope with the skill of Neymar); he did play the full 180 minutes of the 2015 Supercup, in which his club finally overcame the same opponent.

Following the departure of veteran Andoni Iraola, de Marcos became the regular right-back in Ernesto Valverde's line-ups. In November 2016, he suffered an injury to his left foot which caused him to miss two months of action. On his first start since recovering on 22 January 2017, he scored in a 2–2 draw at home to Atlético Madrid, regaining a starting place for the remainder of the season. On 20 August he received another significant injury, a sprain to his left ankle in the opening fixture of the domestic campaign against Getafe CF; he returned three months later, starting in a 2–2 draw away to Deportivo La Coruña on 26 November although he lasted less than an hour before being substituted with an injury once more – this time a problem with his right foot.

In July 2019, de Marcos reached the milestone of ten years with the same club. An injury to his left ankle ligaments forced him to miss much of 2019–20, but he was able to return after the delay caused by the COVID-19 pandemic in Spain.

On 29 November 2020, de Marcos played his 400th match for Athletic as a substitute against Getafe, becoming the 19th player to reach that mark. The following 17 January, he was on target against Barcelona – seconds after Antoine Griezmann's opening goal – in a 3–2 win in the Spanish Supercup final. On 2 February he agreed an extension to his contract to run to the summer of 2022, with no buyout clause.

International career
In November 2015, de Marcos and Nacho were called up into the Spain squad as replacements for the injured Sergio Ramos and Juanfran, ahead of friendlies against England and Belgium. De Marcos did not play either match, with the latter in Brussels being cancelled due to a terrorism-related lockdown.

De Marcos also featured for the unofficial Basque Country regional team.

Personal life
Outside football, de Marcos is known for his humanitarian work, including non-publicised visits to see sick children in local hospitals on a weekly basis and frequent charity visits to Africa and South America, in addition to occasionally offering lifts in his car to supporters who attended training sessions at Lezama on foot.

In 2019, he authored a short book in collaboration with Athletic Bilbao's community foundation, describing the high and low points of his first year at the club which were followed by a trip to the West African country of Togo (the book's title) which helped him put his newfound fame as a sportsman in perspective.

Career statistics

Honours
Athletic Bilbao
Supercopa de España: 2015, 2020–21
Copa del Rey runner-up: 2011–12, 2014–15, 2019–20, 2020–21
UEFA Europa League runner-up: 2011–12

Notes

References

External links

 (archive)

1989 births
Living people
Sportspeople from Álava
Spanish footballers
Footballers from the Basque Country (autonomous community)
Association football defenders
Association football midfielders
Association football forwards
Association football utility players
La Liga players
Segunda División players
Segunda División B players
Tercera División players
Deportivo Alavés B players
Deportivo Alavés players
Bilbao Athletic footballers
Athletic Bilbao footballers
Spain youth international footballers
Spain under-21 international footballers
Spain under-23 international footballers
Basque Country international footballers